The 2023 LPGA Tour is the 74th edition of the LPGA Tour, a series of professional golf tournaments for elite female golfers from around the world. The season began at the Hilton Grand Vacations Tournament of Champions, in Orlando, Florida on January 19, and will end on November 19, at the Tiburón Golf Club in the CME Group Tour Championship at Naples, Florida. The tournaments were sanctioned by the United States-based Ladies Professional Golf Association (LPGA).

Schedule and results
The number in parentheses after each winners' name is the player's total number of wins in official money individual events on the LPGA Tour, including that event. Tournament and winner names in bold indicate LPGA majors. The schedule and purse amount for each tournament is listed on the LPGA website. The LPGA has a standard formula for payout percentages and distribution of its purse and prize money for every event. The winner typically gets 15% of the total, second place gets 9.3%, third place 6.75%, etc.

The total prize money to be won increases to $99.3 million for the 34 now scheduled to be played, $5.4 million more than the $93.9 million in 2022.

Key

Unofficial events
The following team events appear on the schedule, but do not carry official money.

See also
2023 Ladies European Tour
2023 Epson Tour

Notes

References

LPGA Tour seasons
LPGA Tour
LPGA Tour